Cartier station is a Montreal Metro station in Laval, Quebec, Canada. It is operated by the Société de transport de Montréal (STM) and serves the Orange Line. Located in the Pont-Viau district, it is part of an extension into Laval, and opened on April 28, 2007.

Architecture 
It is a normal side platform station. The station's main entrance, adjoining the bus terminal, takes the form of a right triangle, with the legs parallel to the streets and the hypotenuse parallel to the tracks, thereby bringing the aboveground and underground world into relation. There is an entrance at each of the two points of the triangle, while the centre is sunken to provide access to the escalators to the ticket hall and to the tunnel to the secondary entrance. The sunken area looks out onto a sunken garden.

A second entrance on the opposite corner of Boul. des Laurentides and Boul. Cartier, to spare pedestrians from crossing the busy boulevard, was opened on May 22, 2009.

The station features two artworks. The first, L'Homme est un roseau pensant III by Jacek Jarnuszkiewicz, is a pair of tall, slender metal spires on the edge of the garden. The second, Dessins suspendus by Yvon Proulx, is installed in the secondary entrance.

Origin of name
The station is named for nearby Boulevard Cartier, which in turn was named for George-Étienne Cartier, a French-Canadian statesman and Father of Confederation.

Nearby points of interest
 Cartier arena (Laval-des-Rapides)
 Cartier park (Laval-des-Rapides)
 Du Marigot park (Pont-Viau)
 Laval Municipal court (Pont-Viau)
 Ahuntsic Bridge

Terminus Cartier

A large bus terminus with 11 platforms and two park and ride lots (599 free spaces
) has been built above the subway station. The covered bus terminal has an Autorité régionale de transport métropolitain (ARTM) ticket counter, a heated waiting area, and electronic boards to display bus departures.
In addition, a shopping concourse has been built adjacent to the bus terminal to eventually welcome shops and restaurants. A convenience store and a café are currently the only tenants.

Connecting bus routes

Intercity buses

See also 
 ARTM park and ride lots

References

External links
 Cartier Station - Official STM web page 
 Montreal by Metro, metrodemontreal.com
 STL Schedules
 STL 2011 map 
 STM 2011 System map

Accessible Montreal Metro stations
Orange Line (Montreal Metro)
Exo bus stations
Transport in Laval, Quebec
Buildings and structures in Laval, Quebec
Railway stations in Canada opened in 2007
2007 establishments in Quebec